Grigory Solomonovich Pomerants (also: Grigorii or Grigori, 13 March 1918, Vilnius – 16 February 2013, Moscow) was a Russian philosopher and cultural theorist. He is the author of numerous philosophical works that circulated in samizdat and made an impact on the liberal intelligentsia in the 1960s and 1970s.

Early life 
Grigory Pomerants was born in 1918 to a Polish Jewish family in Vilnius, Lithuania. His family moved to Moscow in 1925. His thesis on Fyodor Dostoyevsky was condemned as "anti-Marxist" and as a result he was barred from admission to post-graduate studies in 1939. He went on to lecture at the Tula Pedagogical Institute in 1940.

During the Second World War, Pomerants volunteered to the front, where he fought as a Red Army infantryman. He was wounded in the leg, as a result of which he was assigned as a writer to the editorial office of the divisional newspaper. He was awarded the Order of the Red Star.

In 1946, he was expelled from the Communist Party for "anti-Party statements". Three years later he was arrested and sentenced to five years' imprisonment for anti-Soviet agitation. After Joseph Stalin's death in 1953, he was released due to a general amnesty. He did not rejoin the Party, which prohibited him from teaching at tertiary level. He was also denied Moscow residence. From 1953 to 1956, Pomerants worked as a village school teacher in the Donets Basin and later, upon his return to Moscow, as a bibliographer in the Fundamental Library of Social Sciences of the Russian Academy of Sciences.

Dissident activities 
Under the impression of the Hungarian Revolution of 1956 and the persecution of Boris Pasternak, Pomerants became active as a dissident. In 1959–1960, he led semi-secret seminars on philosophical, historical, political and economic issues. During this time he established contact with dissidents such as Vladimir Osipov and the editors and contributors of the dissident magazine Sintaksis Alexander Ginzburg, Natalya Gorbanevskaya and Yuri Galanskov. He also became close to the painters of the underground Lianozovo group.

On December 3, 1965, Pomerants gave a lecture at the Institute of Philosophy in Moscow publicly denouncing Stalinism. It caused a sensation and became one of the early pieces of samizdat literature. In 1968, he co-signed a petition in support of the participants of the 1968 Red Square demonstration against the introduction of Soviet troops into Czechoslovakia. He also put his signature to Larisa Bogoraz and Pavel Litvinov's "Appeal to the World Public Opinion" in protest of Trial of the Four. As a result, he was deprived of any opportunity to defend his thesis on Zen Buddhism at the Moscow Institute of Oriental Studies.

In addition to official articles, which focused on the spiritual traditions of India and China, Pomerants began to write essays on historical and social topics. While his works were soon stopped from being printed in the Soviet Union, they were widely published in samizdat. They were also reprinted in the western émigré magazines Kontinent, Sintaksis and Strana i Mir, and a collection of essays under the title Neopublikovannoe (Unpublished Works) was published in 1972 in Frankfurt.

Pomerants' political and social articles as well as his public conduct attracted the attention of the KGB. On November 14, 1984, Pomerants was officially warned in connection with his publications abroad. On May 26, 1985, KGB agents searched his flat and confiscated his literary archive.

Philosophical positions 
Andrei Sakharov, who had met Pomerants in an informal seminar at Valentin Turchin's flat in 1970, describes his interests as follows:

Pomerants was among the first Russian disciples of cultural and literary theorist Mikhail Bakhtin.

For many years, Pomerants was involved in polemics with Alexander Solzhenitsyn. Pomerants strongly criticized what he saw as Solzhenitsyn's dogmatic Christian nationalism and positioned himself closer to the liberal, internationalist wing of the intelligentsia. He countered Solzhenitsyn's notion of "evil" as an unavoidably global, well-established phenomenon, associated with Communism, by citing Eastern traditions which reject the notion of an inherently permanent, ontological evil.

Pomerants himself stated that he preferred to be called a "thinker" (myslitel''') rather than a "philosopher", since this term does not imply the academic discipline of philosophy, which he felt was merely neighboring his own work (po sosedstvu).

One of the most quoted pieces in Russian by Pomerants reflected his views on the nature of social debate:

 Other 
Pomerants' lectures and a rejected thesis on Zen Buddhism were studied by filmmaker Andrei Tarkovsky and composer Eduard Artemyev during their work on Stalker. Pomerants also appears in the 2008 documentary Meeting Andrei Tarkovsky.

In 2009, The Bjørnson Prize of the Norwegian Academy of Literature and Freedom of Expression was awarded to Pomerants and Mirkina "for their extensive contribution to strengthening the freedom of expression in Russia."

Pomerants was married to Russian poet Zinaida Mirkina. He died, aged 94, in Moscow, Russia.

 Major works 
Books
  Померанц, Григорий. Открытость бездне [Openness to the Abyss]. М.: Советский писатель, 1990 г., 
  Померанц, Григорий. Выход из транса [Exit from Trance]. Юрист., 1995 г., 
  Миркина, Зинаида; Померанц, Григорий. Великие религии мира [The Major World Religions] М.: Рипол., 1995 г., 
  Померанц, Григорий. Записки гадкого утенка [Notes of an Ugly Duckling], М.: Московский рабочий, (1995) 2003, 
 Pomerants, Grigory. The spiritual movement from the West. An Essay and Two Talks'', Caux: Caux Books, 2004, 
Articles

References 

1918 births
2013 deaths
Writers from Vilnius
Lithuanian Jews
Soviet people of World War II
Soviet dissidents
Soviet prisoners and detainees
Expelled members of the Communist Party of the Soviet Union
Russian male essayists
20th-century Russian philosophers
20th-century essayists
20th-century Russian male writers
Moscow State University alumni